Paddington tube station may refer to one of two London Underground stations serving Paddington mainline station that are shown as a single station on the tube map:
Paddington tube station (Bakerloo, Circle and District lines)
Paddington tube station (Circle and Hammersmith & City lines)

Disambig-Class London Transport articles